Marvin Bernard (born March 31, 1978), better known by his stage name Tony Yayo, is an American rapper. He was best known as a member of G-Unit, a hip hop group he formed with his childhood friends, 50 Cent and Lloyd Banks. Yayo released his debut, and to date, only studio album, Thoughts of a Predicate Felon, on August 30, 2005, which debuted at number two on the Billboard 200.

His stage name is derived from the 1983 film, Scarface, referencing the main character Tony Montana, and Yayo, the slang word for cocaine.

Early life 
Marvin Bernard was born on March 31, 1978 in Jamaica, a neighborhood in Queens, one of the five boroughs of New York City. His parents were Haitian emigrants; he was the youngest of three children. At age fifteen, he dropped out of school in the tenth grade and dealt drugs to support his family. A year later, his parents divorced. As a child, he met his lifelong friends, Lloyd Banks and 50 Cent.

Music career

G-Unit 
After his release from prison on drug charges, the trio formed the group, G-Unit, and began working on music together. The first underground mixtape featuring Bernard (who now went under the stage name Tony Yayo), was 134 All Starz, released in late 2000, referencing his old street he grew up on. However, G-Unit went on a hiatus after 50 Cent was shot nine times and released from Columbia Records. Two years later, G-Unit continued releasing a number of mixtapes in the early 2000s, including 2002's 50 Cent is the Future, No Mercy, No Fear, and God's Plan.

While Yayo was incarcerated in 2003, his comrade 50 Cent was granted his own record label, G-Unit Records after the success of his debut studio album Get Rich or Die Tryin', which was released that February; Yayo appears on the album's track, "Like My Style". 50 immediately signed G-Unit members Yayo and Lloyd Banks to the label, and eventually Young Buck was signed and added to the group as the official fourth member; Buck was later retraced as Yayo's temporary replacement due to his incarceration. From 2003 to 2010, most of G-Unit's artists (including Yayo) were distributed by Interscope Records. G-Unit released their debut studio album, Beg for Mercy, on November 14, 2003. It went on to sell over four million copies in the United States alone. The album was released during which time Yayo was still finishing a prison sentence on various charges, but he was still featured on the album and his face was also shown on the album cover. G-Unit's sophomore and final album, T.O.S: Terminate on Sight, was released on July 31, 2008 and went on to sell 102,000 copies in its first week.

Due to issues between Yayo, 50 and Young Buck, G-Unit went under in 2014, but later reunited as a quintet with all original four members and a newly added Kidd Kidd. They only released two EPs, The Beauty of Independence (2014), and The Beast Is G Unit (2015), before 50 Cent publicly dissolved the group again in 2022.

Solo career 

His career as a rapper was halted by his ongoing jail sentence at the time throughout early 2003 until mid-2004. With Yayo incarcerated, G-Unit and close friend Eminem began a campaign called "Free Yayo". He said that he was unaware of the attention the campaign was getting until he saw Eminem wearing a "Free Yayo" shirt on stage at the 2003 Grammy Awards, where he performed his 8 Mile theme song, "Lose Yourself".

Though his appearances on numerous mixtapes throughout his jail time announced his return on a street level, it was not until the release of Lloyd Banks' "Ain't No Click" and its parent album, The Hunger for More (2004), which featured Yayo that the latter received widespread recognition. His solo career hype was followed up by his debut single, "So Seductive" featuring 50 Cent,
On August 30, 2005, Tony Yayo released his debut studio album, Thoughts of a Predicate Felon, debuting at number two on the Billboard 200 behind Kanye West's Late Registration. He also appeared on the track, "Fake Love", which made its way to the soundtrack for 50 Cent's acting debut, [[Get Rich or Die Tryin' (film)|Get Rich or Die Tryin''']], which released that November.

Since 2007, Tony Yayo has confirmed that work was in progress for his second studio album. As of 2023, the planned second album has not been released. In 2009, Yayo and Lloyd Banks were released from Interscope due to disagreements between the two members, 50 Cent and their former label's co-founder Jimmy Iovine.

On May 20, 2010, Yayo released the single, "Pass the Patron", once again featuring 50 Cent. The single's release was distributed by G-Unit Records and EMI Music Distribution (which is now known today as Virgin Music Label & Artist Services). who will both promote and distribute the album.
On March 2, 2011, Yayo released another single called "Haters". The song features 50 Cent, Shawty Lo and Roscoe Dash. The single was released via the This Is 50 website after its premiere on Hot 97 by Funkmaster Flex. The single rapidly started to gain success on the urban radio charts and soon debuted on the Billboard Hot R&B/Hip-Hop song chart at number one-hundred-twelve.

 Legal issues 

 Felony charges for weapon possession, bail jumping and forged passport; incarceration (2002-04) 
Along with 50 Cent and several other affiliates, Yayo was arrested on December 31, 2002, during a New Year's Eve party in Midtown Manhattan for first-degree possession of a loaded firearm by a convicted felon. He had a Glock 20 handgun and a Colt AR-15 in the trunk of his car. When police discovered that Yayo had a prior for 1996 conviction for drug possession and an outstanding warrant for a previous gun charge, Yayo was sentenced for bail jumping and spent a year in prison. Yayo served time in the Lakeview Shock Incarceration Correctional Facility in the village of Brocton in Chautauqua County, New York. He was paroled on January 8, 2004. The next day, he was arrested for possessing a forged passport and served time in federal prison until February 24, 2004.

 Assault charge and dismissal (2007-08) 
On March 24, 2007, Tony Yayo and childhood friend, Lowell Fletcher (alias Lodi Mack), were both arrested for the alleged simple assault on fourteen-year-old James Rosemond, Jr. (alias Lil Henchman), who is confirmed to be the son of Czar Entertainment founder and drug trafficker James Rosemond (alias Jimmy Henchman). The incident was perceived to have had a connection with Tony Yayo and G-Unit's ongoing dispute with former colleague and Henchman's client at the time, The Game. 50 Cent was also accused of approaching the child, along with members of his entourage, and pushing him against a nearby wall. However, he had proven his innocence with video footage showing him at his former Connecticut mansion at the time of the alleged incident. Yayo reportedly slapped the boy several times and yelled at him "fuck Czar Entertainment, nigga!" His co-conspirator, Fletcher, also pistol whipped Rosemond, Jr., and apparently threatened him with the same gun, causing the adolescent child to run off in fear.

Tony Yayo made his first court appearance on the morning of April 25, 2007, in the United States District Court for the Eastern District of New York. The case was adjourned to July 24. Yayo plead not guilty to all charges. His lawyer has expressed his belief that Yayo is innocent and commented on the situation in an interview with MTV:

A week before his court appearance, on April 18, the house of Yayo's mother was struck with bullets. The attack is believed to be in retaliation for his assault and to be ordered by Jimmy Henchman as vengeance for assaulting his son. Yayo references the attack on the G-Unit song, "Straight Outta Southside" (2008).

On July 24, 2007, Tony Yayo attended a court hearing regarding his alleged assault. The prosecution offered him a nine-month prison sentence if he pleaded guilty, which he rejected. Ultimately, prosecutors dropped all charges against him in February 2008. The mother of Rosemond's son sued him and 50 Cent two months later.

Eventually, his friend Lodi Mack took legal responsibility for the action and plead guilty to aggravated assault with a weapon and a gun violated in relation. He, in November 2007, was sentenced to two years and nine months in prison.

 Murder of close friend and homicide attempts by Jimmy Henchman (2009-14) 
After Yayo's friend, Lowell "Lodi Mack" Fletcher was paroled in late-September 2009, Fletcher was murdered outside of a grocery store in the New York City borough of the Bronx. Also, there were numerous murder attempts on the lives of Tony Yayo and 50 Cent ordered by Jimmy Henchman, including an attempt to explode a "bulletproof" limousine with the two inside of it. 50 responded by recruiting Atlanta gang members to place a dead rat on the doormat of Henchman's home in New York.

In 2014, after a hung jury in a federal trial which charged Rosemond for drug trafficking, murder for hire, conspiracy to commit homicide and other related federal charges in connection to the murder of Yayo's friend, Lodi Mack, and continuing to run his criminal enterprise, he was found guilty of all charges and sentenced to life in prison.

 Discography 

Studio albumsThoughts of a Predicate Felon (2005)The Loyal (2023)

With G-Unit
 Beg for Mercy (with G-Unit) (2003)
 T·O·S (Terminate on Sight)'' (with G-Unit) (2008)

Filmography

References

External links 

American rappers
American male rappers
1978 births
Living people
American rappers of Haitian descent
Dumout Records artists
G-Unit members
G-Unit Records artists
East Coast hip hop musicians
People from Queens, New York
Rappers from New York City
Gangsta rappers
African-American male rappers
21st-century American rappers